Dame Mary Kathleen Cheshire,  ( Lloyd; 31 May 1902 — 3 April 1972) was a director of the Women's Royal Naval Service (WRNS). She was born in Eastbourne, East Sussex

Early life
Lloyd was born in Eastbourne, East Sussex, on 31 May 1902 to Aloysius Joseph Lloyd, a draper, and his wife, Annie (née Grant). She was educated at the Ursuline convent in Wimbledon.

Naval career
Lloyd was the first woman to join the Women's Royal Naval Service (WRNS) when it was re-formed in 1939, and began her service as a steward. The following year she was commissioned as an officer. By 1946 she was acting superintendent, for which service she was appointed an Officer of the Order of the British Empire in the 1946 Birthday Honours. The WRNS was not disbanded after the war, and in 1950 Lloyd succeeded Dame Jocelyn Woollcombe as its director. She was named a Dame Commander of the Order of the British Empire in 1952 and retired two years later.

Personal life
Lloyd married Geoffrey Cheshire, father of the war hero and humanitarian Leonard Cheshire, in 1963. She spent a number of years working with her stepson's eponymous Cheshire Foundation.

Her requiem mass was held at Westminster Cathedral on 28 July 1972, and attended by Queen Elizabeth II.

References

1902 births
1972 deaths
Dames Commander of the Order of the British Empire
People from Eastbourne
Place of death missing
Royal Navy officers of World War II
British women in World War II
Women's Royal Naval Service officers
English Roman Catholics
Women's Royal Naval Service ratings